Negusie v. Holder, 555 U.S. 511 (2009), was a decision by the United States Supreme Court involving whether the bar to asylum in the United States for persecutors applies to asylum applicants who have been the target of credible threats of harm or torture in their home countries for refusing to participate further in persecution. The petitioner, Daniel Negusie, claimed he was forced to assist in the mistreatment of prisoners in Eritrea under threat of execution, and that because any assistance he rendered was provided under duress he should still be eligible for asylum.

The Court held that the Board of Immigration Appeals and United States Court of Appeals for the Fifth Circuit erred in their interpretation of the Court's holding in Fedorenko v. United States (1981) when they evaluated Daniel's asylum petition, as they presumed that an alien's claimed coercion to participate in persecution was immaterial to determining whether the "persecutor bar" applies.

See also 
Fedorenko v. United States (1981)

References

Further reading

External links
 

2009 in United States case law
United States Supreme Court cases
United States Supreme Court cases of the Roberts Court
United States immigration and naturalization case law
Penal system in Eritrea
Eritrean emigrants to the United States